Walter R. Tschinkel is an American myrmecologist, entomologist and Distinguished Research Professor of Biological Science and R.O. Lawton Distinguished Professor emeritus at Florida State University. He is the author of the Pulitzer Prize nominated book The Fire Ants (Harvard University/Belknap Press 2006), the book Ant Architecture: The Wonder, Beauty, and Science of Underground Nests (Princeton University Press 2021), and more than 150 original research papers on the natural history, ecology, nest architecture and organization of ant societies; chemical communication in beetles; and the mysterious fairy circles of the Namib desert. His casts of ant nests and botanical drawings appear in numerous museums of art and natural history, from Hong Kong to Paris.

Tschinkel is known for his thorough and inventive experimental design, often involving the construction of special contraptions (stimulatorium, trash can kiln, ice nests ) and re-purposing methods from other fields of inquiry. In 1991, he coined the term "insect sociometry" to describe an under-emphasized method, involving the detailed physical and numerical description of social insect colonies; which he views as superorganisms.  He is an advocate of scientific natural history and the "bottom-up" approach to biological research, noting that, "...empirical evidence is the horse that pulls the cart of theory through testing, and the three move along the road to understanding." He suggests that novel and meaningful research questions are best derived from extensive observation, familiarity and careful experimentation.

Tschinkel has written extensively on education. He also served as a major professor and mentor to 22 Masters and PhD students, and more than 71 undergraduate researchers. In 2013, Tschinkel retired from teaching. Today he remains active in research, with field sites in Florida's Apalachicola National Forest and Namibia. In addition to numerous professional honors and accolades, Walter Tschinkel is a fellow of the Entomological Society of America, co-founder of the environmental advocacy group, Friends of The Apalachicola National Forest, and a committee member for The Nierenberg Prize for Science in the Public Interest.

Life

Walter Reinhart Tschinkel was born on September 15, 1940, in what is now the Czech Republic. He is the son of Dr. Johann G. Tschinkel and Lotte G. Tschinkel and brother to Henry and Helga Tschinkel. His family emigrated to the United States in 1946, where his father worked in rocket development for the U.S. Army at Ft. Bliss, Texas, and later for the Space Flight Center in Huntsville, Alabama. In 1962, Walter received a B.A. in biology from Wesleyan University in Middletown, Connecticut. He went on to the University of California Berkeley where he completed a Masters (1965) and PhD (1968) with Howard Bern and Clyde Willson, in Comparative Biochemistry, for work on the chemical communication and chemical defenses of tenebrionid beetles. Following graduation, he conducted postdoctoral research with Tom Eisner at Cornell University in Ithaca, New York and later served as a lecturer at the Rhodes University in Grahamstown, South Africa. He accepted a position in the Department of Biological Science at Florida State University in Tallahassee, Florida in 1970, attaining the status of full professor in 1980. In 2000, Florida State University began a program allowing faculty with named professorships to select the name used and in 2002, Tschinkel opted to honor Margaret Menzel by opting for the "Margaret Menzel Professor of Biological Science". Now retired, Tschinkel lives in Tallahassee Florida with his wife Victoria Tschinkel (m. 1968). They have one daughter, Erika Tschinkel.

Research themes and discoveries
 Chemical defenses of tenebrionid beetles: chemistry, behavior, morphology
 Comparative internal morphology and systematics of tenebrionid beetles
 Inhibition of metamorphosis by crowding in the tenebrionid beetle Zophobas rugipes (endocrinology, behavior, life history and population	dynamics).
 Architecture of subterranean ant nests (numerous species)
 Social biology of the fire ant, Solenopsis invicta

Books
 
Walter R. Tschinkel (2021). Ant Architecture: The Wonder, Beauty, and Science of Underground Nests. Princeton University Press. ISBN 9780691179315.

References

External links
 Dr. Walter R. Tschinkel, FSU Biological Science Faculty Member

American entomologists
21st-century American zoologists
Florida State University faculty
Living people
Myrmecologists
Year of birth missing (living people)